Skopinsky (masculine), Skopinskaya (feminine), or Skopinskoye (neuter) may refer to:
Skopinsky District, a district of Ryazan Oblast
Skopinskaya, a rural locality (a village) in Arkhangelsk Oblast, Russia